Henry Dallas "Harry" Helmcken (December 23, 1859 – 1912) was a lawyer and political figure in British Columbia. He represented Victoria City in the Legislative Assembly of British Columbia from 1894 to 1903.

The son of John Sebastian Helmcken, he was educated at the Nest Academy in Jedburgh, Scotland, at Edinburgh University, at London University and at Osgoode Hall. In 1895, he married Hannah Jane Goodwin, a widow. Helmcken was director of the Jubilee Hospital. He ran unsuccessfully in the provincial riding of Esquimalt as a Conservative in 1909 and then as an independent Conservative in 1912.

References 

1859 births
1912 deaths
Independent MLAs in British Columbia